The Kalka Devi Temple, Kalka Devi Cave Temple or Kalka Devi Mandir is one of the holiest Hindu temples in Pakistan. It is situated inside a natural cave in the Kalka hills in Rohri, Sindh province, Pakistan. The temple is known as the Asthan of Kalka Devi. It is visited by both Hindus and Muslims. Hindus from India also visit. The majority of devotees visiting the temple are Muslims.

Significance
This is one of the historic Hindu temples in Pakistan. According to the legend, Goddess Kalka Devi appeared on this place on her way to the Hinglaj Mata temple. According to the caretaker of the temple, there are two tunnels in the Kalka Cave temple which connect to the Hinglaj Mata temple.

The temple is dedicated to the Goddess Kali. The word Kalka means power in Shashthi language. Devotees visit the temple on evening of the first Monday of every month.

See also
 Ramapir Temple Tando Allahyar
 Hinglaj Mata mandir
 Shree Ratneshwar Mahadev Temple, Karachi
 Shri Krishna Mandir, Rawalpindi
 Krishna Temple, Sadiqabad
 Darya Lal Mandir

References

Hindu temples in Sindh